Alfredo Czerner (born 16 July 1934) is an Argentine rower. He competed in the men's coxed four event at the 1952 Summer Olympics.

References

External links
 
 

1934 births
Living people
Argentine male rowers
Olympic rowers of Argentina
Rowers at the 1952 Summer Olympics
Place of birth missing (living people)
Pan American Games medalists in rowing
Pan American Games gold medalists for Argentina
Pan American Games silver medalists for Argentina
Rowers at the 1955 Pan American Games